Rhaeboctesis is a genus of spiders in the family Liocranidae. It was first described in 1897 by Simon. , it contains seven species.

Species
Rhaeboctesis comprises the following species:
Rhaeboctesis denotatus Lawrence, 1928 - Angola, Namibia
Rhaeboctesis equestris Simon, 1897 - South Africa
Rhaeboctesis exilis Tucker, 1920 - South Africa
Rhaeboctesis matroosbergensis Tucker, 1920 - South Africa
Rhaeboctesis secundus Tucker, 1920 - South Africa
Rhaeboctesis transvaalensis Tucker, 1920 - South Africa
Rhaeboctesis trinotatus Tucker, 1920 - South Africa

References

Liocranidae
Araneomorphae genera
Spiders of Africa